Jonathan Sweet is an Australian actor.

Career 
Sweet co-starred in the 1969 TV series Riptide, an Australian production starring the American actor Ty Hardin as Moss Andrews, the owner of a charter boat.

Sweet was cast in the 1985 TV mini-series Anzacs, portraying Harris, a former British soldier who had absconded from Afghanistan to Australia.

Sweet was also cast as Sergeant Thomas in the 1990 Tom Selleck movie Quigley Down Under.

External links 

Riptide classicaustraliantv.com

Australian male film actors
Australian male television actors
Living people
Year of birth missing (living people)
Place of birth missing (living people)